Pierre Rivory (born 22 September 1945) is a French racing cyclist. He rode in the 1971 Tour de France.

References

1945 births
Living people
French male cyclists
Place of birth missing (living people)